A9, A.9, A09, A 9 or A-9 may refer to

Science
 ATC code A09 Digestives, including enzymes, a subgroup of the Anatomical Therapeutic Chemical Classification System
 Biolimus A9, an immunosuppressant
 British NVC community A9, the Potamogeton natans community, one of the aquatic communities of the British National Vegetation Classification
 HLA-A9, a broad antigen serogroup of Human MHC HLA-A
 Subfamily A9, a Rhodopsin-like receptors subfamily

Technology
 A9home, a small form factor computer
 A9.com, a website and search engine by Amazon.com
 Apple A9, a 64-bit system on a chip (SoC) designed by Apple Inc.
 Hanlin eReader A9, an ebook reader

Aviation
 Breda A.9, a 1928 Italian biplane trainer aircraft
 CallAir A-9 Quail, an agricultural aircraft
 Georgian Airways's IATA code
 Lockheed A-9, a ground attack aircraft based on the Lockheed YP-24 fighter prototype
 Northrop YA-9, a ground-attack aircraft that competed with the Fairchild Republic A-10 Thunderbolt II

Military
 A9, a military staff designation in the continental staff system
 A 9, a Swedish artillery regiment
 A9, a model of German Aggregate Series Rocket from World War II
 Cruiser Mk I (A9), a British tank

Music
A9 (band), a Japanese rock band originally named Alice Nine
 A-9, a Gibson mandolin guitar model

Other uses
 A9 (classification), an amputee sport classification
 A9 road, in several countries, see List of A9 roads
 A9, an international ISO 216 paper size standard (37×52 mm)
 A-9 Vigilance, a fictional starfighter from the Star Wars universe
 Arrows A9, a 1986 British racing car
 , a 1988 diving support vessel for the Royal New Zealand Navy
 HMS A9, an A-class submarine of the Royal Navy
 Réti Opening or A09, a chess opening
 A9 TV, a Turkish television station

See also
 Grumman Gooseor Grumman OA-9, "Goose" amphibious aircraft in USAAC service
 α9 (disambiguation)